is a Shingon temple in Uzumasa, Ukyō Ward, Kyoto, Japan.

Kōryū-ji is said to be the oldest temple in Kyoto, having been constructed in 603 by Hata no Kawakatsu upon receiving a Buddhist statue from Prince Shōtoku.  Fires in 818 and 1150 destroyed the entire temple complex, but it was rebuilt several times since.

Wooden statue of Bodhisattva

The temple contains a number of important pieces of cultural heritage.  One of  national treasures in Japan (registered on June 9, 1951), a wooden image of the Bodhisattva Maitreya sitting contemplatively in the half-lotus position, called  is amongst the rare objects that are preserved and displayed at Kōryū-ji.

The temple is also renowned for its , traditionally held in mid-October, but currently suspended.

Notes

See also
Historical Sites of Prince Shōtoku
 List of Buddhist temples in Kyoto
 List of National Treasures of Japan (temples)
 List of National Treasures of Japan (ancient documents)
List of National Treasures of Japan (sculptures)
 For an explanation of terms concerning Japanese Buddhism, Japanese Buddhist art, and Japanese Buddhist temple architecture, see the Glossary of Japanese Buddhism.

References
 Daijirin, 2nd edition
 Daijisen, 1st edition
 Kōjien, 5th edition
 Ponsonby-Fane, Richard Arthur Brabazon. (1956). Kyoto: The Old Capital of Japan, 794-1869. Kyoto: The Ponsonby Memorial Society.

External links
 images of Hondo (1730)
 image of Nandiamon (1702)
 images of the statuary

Shingon Buddhism
Buddhist temples in Kyoto
Important Cultural Properties of Japan
Maitreya
Prince Shōtoku